Cychrus attenuatus is a species of beetle from a family Carabidae, that is endemic to Europe. It is found in Austria, Belgium, Bosnia and Herzegovina, Croatia, the Czech Republic, mainland France, Germany, Hungary, mainland Italy, Liechtenstein, Luxembourg, Moldova, North Macedonia, Poland, Romania, Slovakia, Slovenia, Switzerland, and Ukraine.

References

External links

attenuatus
Beetles described in 1792
Beetles of Europe